Paja Francuski (born 1949) is a politician in Serbia. He was the mayor of Kikinda from 1996 to 2000, served in the Assembly of Vojvodina from 1997 to 2004, and was a member of the Executive Council of Vojvodina from 2000 to 2004. During his time as an elected official, Francuski was a member of the League of Social Democrats of Vojvodina (Liga socijaldemokrata Vojvodine, LSV).

Early life and private career
Francuski was born in Kikinda in the Autonomous Province of Vojvodina, in what was then the People's Republic of Serbia in the Federal People's Republic of Yugoslavia. He graduated from the University of Belgrade Faculty of Mining and Geology and worked at Naftna Industrija Srbije.

Politician

During the Milošević years (1992–2000)
Francuski was first elected to the Kikinda municipal assembly in the December 1992 Serbian local elections.

In 1996, the LSV formed an alliance known as the Vojvodina Coalition (Koalicija Vojvodina, KV) with two other regional parties. This coalition won a plurality victory in Kikinda in the 1996 local elections and, in conjunction with the mostly supportive Zajedno (English: Together) coalition, controlled a majority of seats in the assembly. Francuski was re-elected to the assembly and, when it convened, was chosen as its president (i.e., speaker). At the time, this position was equivalent to that of mayor.

Francuski was also elected for Kikinda's second division as a Vojvodina Coalition candidate in the concurrent 1996 Vojvodina provincial election and was sworn in when the assembly convened in early 1997. The election was won by the Socialist Party of Serbia (Socijalistička partija Srbije, SPS), and Francuski served in opposition. 

The LSV left the Vojvodina Coalition in 1998. Over the next two years, Francuski emerged as a prominent local opponent of Slobodan Milošević's government. In September 1999, he attended a meeting of the Socialist International's committee on local authorities with another member of the Serbian opposition.

The fall of Milošević and after (2000–12)
The LSV joined the Democratic Opposition of Serbia (Demokratska opozicija Srbije, DOS), a broad and ideologically diverse coalition of parties opposed to Milošević's government, in 2000. The DOS defeated Milošević in the 2000 Yugoslavian general election, an event that prompted wide-scale changes in Serbian politics.

Francuski was re-elected for Kikinda's second division as a DOS candidate in the 2000 provincial election and was also re-elected to the Kikinda municipal assembly in the concurrent 2000 local elections. The DOS won majority victories at both levels of government. When the provincial assembly convened, Francuski was appointed as one of the vice-presidents of Vojvodina's executive council. He served in this capacity until 2002, when he was re-assigned as the provincial secretary for energy and minerals. In the latter role, he took part in discussions about forming a public company for natural gas distribution in the province; in September 2003, he had to announce that this plan was being abandoned, as there were no viable options to provide a stable, safe, and cheap supply to consumers. The following year, he complained that relations between the republican and provincial energy ministries were not satisfactory.

The DOS coalition had dissolved by 2004, and the LSV contested that year's provincial election in its own Together for Vojvodina (Zajedno za Vojvodinu, ZZV) coalition. Francuski sought re-election in Kikinda's second division and was defeated. He stood down from the executive council shortly after the election.

Francuski briefly returned to political life in 2012 as a member of the Preokret (English: U-Turn) coalition. He sought re-election to the provincial assembly in his old constituency for the 2012 provincial election and was defeated. He also appeared in the third position on the U-Turn list for Kikinda in the 2012 local elections; the list did not cross the electoral threshold to win any mandates.

Electoral record

Provincial (Vojvodina)

References

1949 births
Living people
People from Kikinda
Mayors of places in Serbia
Members of the Assembly of Vojvodina
Members of the Executive Council of Vojvodina
League of Social Democrats of Vojvodina politicians